Noah Clowney is an American college basketball player for Alabama Crimson Tide.

Early life and high school
Clowney grew up in Spartanburg, South Carolina and attended Dorman High School. As a junior, he averaged 9.6 points, 7.9 rebounds, and 1.4 blocks over 26 games. Clowney averaged 17.5 points, 9.7 rebounds, and 1.7 blocks per game during his senior season.
 
Clowney was rated a four-star recruit and committed to play college basketball at Alabama over offers from Virginia Tech, Florida, and Indiana.

College career
During the summer before his freshman season at Alabama, Clowney took part in the Crimson Tide's European tour and averaged 12.3 points and 7.7 rebounds per game. In a game against the Chinese national team, he scored 11 points and grabbed 10 rebounds. Clowney entered his freshman season as Alabama's starting power forward. He was named the Southeastern Conference (SEC) Freshman of the Week for the first two weeks of December.

References

External links
Alabama Crimson Tide bio

Living people
American men's basketball players
Basketball players from South Carolina
Alabama Crimson Tide men's basketball players
Power forwards (basketball)
Year of birth missing (living people)